The 1952 United States presidential election in North Carolina took place on November 4, 1952, as part of the 1952 United States presidential election. North Carolina voters chose 14 representatives, or electors, to the Electoral College, who voted for president and vice president.

Background
As a former Confederate state, North Carolina had a history of Jim Crow laws, disfranchisement of its African-American population and dominance of the Democratic Party in state politics. However, unlike the Deep South, the Republican Party had sufficient historic Unionist white support from the mountains and northwestern Piedmont to gain one-third of the statewide vote total in most general elections, where turnout was higher than elsewhere in the former Confederacy due substantially to the state's early abolition of the poll tax in 1920. Like Virginia, Tennessee and Oklahoma, the relative strength of Republican opposition meant that North Carolina did not have statewide white primaries, although certain counties did use the white primary. This persistent local Republican threat from mountain Unionist descendants meant that there was never any question of the state Democratic party bolting to support Strom Thurmond. Additionally, the greatest support for Thurmond was found in middle- and upper-class urban areas of the Piedmont, so that the best Dixiecrat counties correlated strongly with the largest urban areas.

During Truman's second term, there was little satisfaction in North Carolina with the President, due to unresolved Civil Rights struggles, strikes, and evidence of corruption in the Democratic Party. At the beginning of the presidential campaign, though, there was no indication that the state would not back new Democratic nominee Adlai Stevenson, and all state Democrats endorsed him. Stevenson began his campaign in the Tar Heel State in late July, but did not return to the state as it was felt by September that Republican nominee and Columbia University President Dwight D. Eisenhower had less chance than in Florida, Texas or the Dixiecrat states of Louisiana and South Carolina. Stevenson was helped by the fact that, much more than in other Southern States, North Carolina's press largely endorsed him over Eisenhower, although in mid-October one of the two largest papers was endorsing the Republican. Nonetheless, polls ten days before the election suggested Stevenson was very likely to carry the state due to the party loyalty created by viable mountain and northwest Piedmont Republican opposition.

Vote
Because the Black Belt of the state, unlike the economically conservative Black Belts of the Deep South, was economically more liberal than the Piedmont region where the establishment Democratic faction led since 1929 by O. Max Gardner was based, its entirely white electorate stayed exceedingly loyal to Stevenson – much more so than the Black Belts of other Outer South states. This Democratic loyalty extended to the Outer Banks, which had been a center of anti-Catholic voting when Herbert Hoover carried the state in 1928, so that apart from a seven-vote win in Brunswick County, every county Eisenhower carried was in the urban Piedmont or traditionally GOP mountains. Thus, unlike Texas, Florida and Virginia, urban middle-class Republican voting was inadequate to carry the state for Eisenhower.

North Carolina was ultimately won by Governor Stevenson with 53.91 percent of the popular vote, against Eisenhower with 46.09 percent of the popular vote. Stevenson ran with Alabama Senator John Sparkman and Eisenhower with California Senator Richard Nixon.

Results

Results by county

References

North Carolina
1952
1952 North Carolina elections